George William Berry (18 May 1913 – 4 April 1998) was an Australian politician who was a Liberal Party member of the Legislative Council of Western Australia from 1968 to 1980, representing Lower North Province.

Berry was born in Perth to Annie Adelaide (née Holding) and George Berry. He attended the Fremantle Boys' School, but left at the age of 13. Berry enlisted in the Royal Australian Air Force (RAAF) in 1941, and during the war served as a flight sergeant.  After the war, he worked in Spearwood as a master butcher, and served on the Fremantle Road Board from 1946 to 1952. Berry moved to Carnarvon in 1954, where he farmed bananas. He served as secretary and treasurer of the local Liberal Party branch, and entered parliament at the 1968 state election, winning his seat from Labor's Eric Heenan. Berry was re-elected at the 1974 election, but retired at the 1980 election. He died in Carnarvon in April 1998, aged 84. He had married Dorothy Isabel Straughair in 1943, with whom he had three children. A son-in-law, Ian Laurance, was also a member of parliament.

References

1913 births
1998 deaths
Liberal Party of Australia members of the Parliament of Western Australia
Members of the Western Australian Legislative Council
Politicians from Perth, Western Australia
Royal Australian Air Force personnel of World War II
Western Australian local councillors
Royal Australian Air Force airmen